Eupoecilia anebrica is a species of moth of the family Tortricidae. It was described from Mount Bandahara in Aceh, Indonesia.

References

Moths described in 1983
Eupoecilia